Azerbaijan Futsal Premier League is the premier futsal league in Azerbaijan.  It was founded in 1994. Organized by Association of Football Federations of Azerbaijan and is played under UEFA rules, currently consists of 8 teams.

History
Araz Naxçivan is very dominant in Azeri futsal, winning Premier League ten times in a row.

Champions

Results by team

References

External links
Association of Football Federations of Azerbaijan ; (English version)
Futsalplanet 

Futsal competitions in Azerbaijan
Azerbaijan
Futsal
1994 establishments in Azerbaijan
Sports leagues established in 1994